The Beacon Street Girls (BSG) is a young adult book series by Annie Bryant. The series was created by Addie Swartz and initially published by B*tween Productions, then licensed by Simon & Schuster.

Author
"Annie Bryant" is a pseudonym for a group of writers who wrote the Beacon Street Girls books. The series was edited by Roberta MacPhee.

Background
The Beacon Street Girls brand started in 2003 by entrepreneur Addie Swartz. It comprised a book series, branded gifts and a website, all aimed at creating healthier role models and more positive messages for pre-teen girls. The series is designed for girls ages 9–14 and was produced following consultations with experts in different areas of teen research. The books offer an alternative to the perceived preponderance of provocative and objectionable messages aimed at youth culture, particularly "tweens". Books were initially bundled with bags, backpacks and accessories, and sold as a package. The series was self-published by B*tween Productions as part of a bigger initiative to create a multi-media brand that was healthy and positive. The books were subsequently licensed to Simon & Schuster in 2007. Initial runs of the series were limited to 5,000 to 10,000 printings but sold out quickly.

Reception
Community and critical reception to the series has been very positive, with educators praising the series for its focus on tackling issues such as cyber-bullying, under-age drinking, childhood obesity, and responsible weight loss. A longitudinal study conducted by Duke Medical Center on the influence of reading on weight loss showed that "girls who read the book entitled "Charlotte in Paris" ... saw a dip in their BMI scores, but not as much as those who read the Beacon Street Girls book "Lake Rescue."" The School Library Journal praised the series, writing that Katani's Jamaican Holiday was "a lively introduction to Jamaica's rich history, culture, and lifestyle."

Characters
Avery Madden: Avery is an energetic and outspoken girl who is passionate about sports, animal rights, and the environment. She's from Korea; her parents (who are now divorced) adopted her when she was a baby and brought her to America. She loves Marty but, sadly, she is not allowed to have any furry pets of her own because her mother is allergic to fur, but she does have Frogster (a frog) and Walter (a snake). She doesn't like being labeled. Avery is tiny and slightly hyper, which is a part of her natural love for sports, especially soccer. Avery drives all of her friends crazy, but they love her anyway. She laughs at anything and everything, sometimes speaking without thinking. Avery has two older brothers: Tim and Scott. She is likable and loves the Red Sox, particularly Robbie Flores.
Charlotte Ramsey: Charlotte loves school and wants to be a writer one day. She has traveled to many places, including Australia, Tanzania, and Paris. She stargazes and writes in her journal constantly. She hates being onstage or in the spotlight unless she is doing magic. She is very close to her elderly landlady, Miss Pierce, and often visits her for help with schoolwork and talk about life. Charlotte lives with only her father, a travel writer, since her mother died of pneumonia when she was only 4 years old. Charlotte has a crush on Nick Montoya, who also enjoys travel and is one of her good friends. Charlotte wrote the Tower Rules and is secretary of the BSG. 
Isabel Martinez: Isabel is a Hispanic-American girl who moved to Boston so her mother could pursue treatment for multiple sclerosis. Her father was left behind when she moved from Michigan. Isabel is a fan of art and basketball. She used to dance but injured her knee when dancing ballet and is unable to continue. She is new to Abigail Adams Jr. High and soon became close friends with Maeve and Charlotte. She then joined the BSG, despite Katani and Avery's cold reactions to her at first. Isabel later becomes good 'friends' with Kevin Connors in the 10th book, Just Kidding. She loves to draw birds and often submits cartoons to the school newspaper, the Sentinel. She is known as a sweet girl and loves birds, especially her pet parrot Franco. She's a very talented artist. 
Katani Summers: Also known as K-girl, Katani loves fashion and is loyal to her friends. Her grandmother is the principal of Abigail Adams Jr. High. Katani has an older sister, Kelley, who is mildly autistic and doesn't act like she's 14, though she is. Katani is a very responsible girl. She sometimes seems cold at first glance but is very kind and caring. Charlotte describes her as "a marshmallow disguised as a cactus." Katani gives style advice to all of the BSG, even Avery, who resists it. She doesn't like singing, as she isn't very good at it. She has a tentative relationship with Reggie DeWitt, whom she went to the Valentine's Day Dance with. She is the most organized of the BSG and adores sewing and horseback riding. 
Maeve Kaplan-Taylor: Maeve is an outgoing and bubbly young teenager who wants to be a movie star. Her parents are separated, and she has a younger brother named Sam. Maeve is Irish and Jewish. She is constantly frustrated with schoolwork because she's dyslexic. She tries her best in school despite this, and uses a laptop in class as well as meeting with a math tutor once a week. She is notably "boy crazy." Her many crushes include Nick Montoya, Dillon Johnson, baseball player Robbie Flores, Chad (Chizzam), Billy Trentini, Apollo, Simon Blackwell, a waiter at Montoya's Bakery, her tutor Matt, Kevin Connors, Riley Lee and Trevor. She loves to command attention and to be center stage, whether she is acting, singing, or dancing. She is consistently disorganized, often recruiting her friends' help in her large endeavors such as Project Thread, which was aimed to deliver handmade blankets to the local homeless shelter. In the book Letters From The Heart, she receives an award for Project Thread. 
Nick Montoya: Nick is a very kind, popular boy who has a crush on Charlotte. He is friends with all of the BSG, especially Charlotte. His family owns a local bakery called Montoya's; the BSG visit there frequently. Many girls at Abigail Adams Junior High like him for his friendly personality and good looks. He helps to form a travel club with Charlotte and Chelsea. He and Charlotte kiss for the first time on Valentine's Day at night in the falling snow after a dance in the 14th book, Crush Alert. 
Chelsea Briggs: Chelsea is a classmate of the BSG at Abigail Adams Junior High, who is overweight but begins losing weight. Her most notable appearance is in Lake Rescue, in which she is described as such: "It was almost as if she was invisible, which was odd because Chelsea was so large." A study was conducted later, and it became proven that Chelsea's largeness inspired test subjects to lose weight. Later in the series, she becomes good friends with Charlotte and Nick Montoya. She has a passion for photography. Chelsea is good friends with the BSG. 
Betsy Fitzgerald: Betsy is in the same homeroom as the BSG. She is very intelligent and organized, and she always walks briskly, as if late for an appointment. Her dreams include getting into an Ivy League school, preferably Harvard, which her older brother attends. She constantly tries to build an impressive resume. Despite her stress over college, she is smart and friendly. Still, she can be a little annoying to the BSG. She can head anything and was a historical adviser for the movie Pirates of the Cape. 
Happy Lucky Thingy: A pink toy that Avery Madden gave to their pet dog Marty. Happy Lucky Thingy is Marty's favorite chew toy. Though it is a small cloth toy the dog plays with, it never needs to be replaced and has a place in the hearts of all the BSG. 
Anna McMasters: One of the mean girls at school, she and her friend Joline are known for their cruelty and meanness. She is tall, blond, and wants to be a model. She has a sticker on her locker saying "It's an inside joke...and you're on the outside!" Anna is good at sports, often playing on the same teams as Avery. Anna is referred to as one of the "Queens of Mean" by the BSG and the rest of the school. Anna doesn't like Kiki very much because Kiki is trying to take away her friendship with Joline.
Joline Kaminsky: Anna's friend and henchwoman, Joline is one of the mean girls at school. She has a fondness for animals. Joline is very similar to Anna, but she doesn't play any sports. Joline is one of the "Queens of Mean". 
Kiki Underwood: Kiki is one of the mean girls at school. She is very loving to her parents, and her famous father has been shown to spoil her, as he offered to make a music video based on their talent show act. She is known by the BSG and the rest of the school as the "Empress of Mean," which they make no attempt to hide. Some things she enjoys to do include boating and showing off her riches.
Mrs. Montoya: Nick's mom is in charge of Montoya's Bakery. She is Hispanic and sprinkles Spanish words into her vocabulary like "hola" and "amigas," but only in moderation so a reader can understand.
Other minor characters: Sophie Morel, Dillon Johnson, Riley Lee, Henry Yurt, Reggie DeWitt, Elena Maria Martinez, Scott Madden, Kelley Summers, Sam Kaplan-Taylor, Mrs. Fields, Ms. Rodriguez, Miss Sapphire Pierce, Mrs. Weiss, Ms. Razzberry Pink, Yuri, LaFanny, and Marty (LaFanny and Marty are dogs).

Books in the series
Main Series:
Worst Enemies / Best Friends
Bad News / Good News
Letters from the Heart
Out of Bounds
Promises Promises
Lake Rescue
Freaked Out
Lucky Charm
Fashion Frenzy
Just Kidding
Ghost Town
Time’s Up
Green Algae and Bubble Gum Wars
Crush Alert
Scavenger Hunt
Sweet Thirteen

Special Adventures:
Charlotte in Paris
Freestyle with Avery
Isabel's Texas Two-Step
Katani's Jamaican Holiday
Maeve on the Red Carpet
Ready! Set! Hawaii!

References

External links
 The Beacon Street Girls official website

Young adult novels
Series of children's books
Series of books